Brower's Bridge is a historic stone arch bridge located in East Nantmeal Township and Warwick Township, Chester County, Pennsylvania, US. It spans French Creek. The bridge was constructed in 1904 of coursed rubble stone with brick arch rings.

It was listed on the National Register of Historic Places in 1988.

References 
 

Road bridges on the National Register of Historic Places in Pennsylvania
Bridges completed in 1904
Bridges in Chester County, Pennsylvania
National Register of Historic Places in Chester County, Pennsylvania
Stone arch bridges in the United States